Wulfsige was a medieval Bishop of Cornwall.

Wulfsige was consecrated between 959 and 963. He died between 981 and 993.

Citations

References

 Powicke, F. Maurice and E. B. Fryde Handbook of British Chronology 2nd. ed. London:Royal Historical Society 1961

External links
 , as "Wulfsige Comoere" – PASE does not distinguish between Wulfsige and Comoere

Bishops of Cornwall
10th-century English bishops
10th-century deaths
Year of birth unknown